Chaoyangsauridae is a family of ceratopsian dinosaurs. They are among the earliest known marginocephalian dinosaurs, with remains dating to about 160 million years ago, during the Late Jurassic period. Members of this group had sharp beaks for snipping off leaves to eat, and a very small frill.

Four dinosaur genera, Chaoyangsaurus, Xuanhuaceratops, Yinlong and Hualianceratops, are usually considered to belong to the Chaoyangsauridae. All four animals are more primitive (or basal) than both Psittacosaurus and neoceratopsians.

See also
 Timeline of ceratopsian research

References

Ceratopsians
Prehistoric dinosaur families